This article contains a list of current SNCF railway stations in the Bourgogne-Franche-Comté region of France, sorted by department.

Côte-d'Or (21)

 Aiserey
 Auxonne
 Beaune
 Blaisy-Bas
 Brazey-en-Plaine
 Bretigny-Norges
 Chaugey
 Collonges
 Corgoloin
 Dijon-Porte-Neuve
 Dijon-Ville
 Gemeaux
 Genlis
 Gevrey-Chambertin
 Is-sur-Tille
 Lantenay
 Les Laumes
 Liernais
 Longecourt
 Mâlain
 Manlay
 Meursault
 Montbard
 Neuilly-lès-Dijon
 Nuits-Saint-Georges
 Ouges
 Pagny
 La Roche-en-Brenil
 Ruffey
 Saint-Jean-de-Losne
 Saint-Julien-Clenary
 Santenay-les-Bains
 Saulieu
 Saulon
 Seurre
 Sincey-lès-Rouvray
 Thenissey
 Velars
 Verrey
 Villers-les-Pots
 Vougeot-Gilly-lès-Cîteaux

Doubs (25)

 Arc-et-Senans
 Avoudrey
 Baume-les-Dames
 Besançon Franche-Comté TGV
 Besançon-Mouillère
 Besançon-Viotte
 Boujailles
 Byans
 Clerval
 Colombier-Fontaine
 Dannemarie-Velesmes
 Deluz
 École-Valentin
 Étalans
 Franois
 Frasne
 Gilley
 L'Hôpital-du-Grosbois
 L'Isle-sur-le-Doubs
 Labergement-Sainte-Marie
 Laissey
 Liesle
 Mamirolle
 Montbéliard
 Montferrand-Thoraise
 Morre
 Morteau
 Novillars
 Pontarlier
 La Rivière
 Roche-lez-Beaupré
 Sainte-Colombe
 Saint-Vit
 Saône
 Torpes-Boussières
 Le Valdahon
 Voujeaucourt

Haute-Saône (70)

 Aillevillers
 Champagney
 Héricourt
 Lure
 Luxeuil-les-Bains
 Ronchamp
 Vesoul

Jura (39)

 Andelot
 Arbois
 Champagnole
 Champagnole-Paul-Émile-Victor
 La Chaumusse-Fort-du-Plasne
 La Chaux-des-Crotenay
 Cousance
 Dole-Ville
 Domblans-Voiteur
 Lons-le-Saunier
 Montbarrey
 Morbier
 Morez
 Mouchard
 Orchamps
 Poligny
 Ranchot
 Saint-Amour
 Saint-Claude
 Saint-Laurent-en-Grandvaux
 Saint-Lothain

Nièvre (58)

 Béard
 Cercy-la-Tour
 Chantenay-Saint-Imbert
 La Charité
 Clamecy
 Corbigny
 Cosne-sur-Loire
 Decize
 Flez-Cuzy-Tannay
 Fourchambault
 Garchizy
 Imphy
 Luzy
 La Marche
 Mesves-Bulcy
 Nevers
 Nevers-le-Banlay
 Nevers-les-Perrières
 Pougues-les-Eaux
 Pouilly-sur-Loire
 Saincaize
 Saint-Pierre-le-Moûtier
 Tracy-Sancerre
 Tronsanges
 Vauzelles

Saône-et-Loire (71)

 Autun
 Blanzy
 Brion-Laizy
 Broye
 Chagny
 Chalon-sur-Saône
 Chauffailles
 Cheilly-lès-Maranges
 Ciry-le-Noble
 La Clayette-Baudemont
 Cordesse-Igornay
 Crêches-sur-Saône
 Le Creusot
 Le Creusot TGV
 Digoin
 Étang-sur-Arroux
 Fleurville-Pont-de-Vaux
 Fontaines-Mercurey
 Galuzot
 Génelard
 Gilly-sur-Loire
 Louhans
 Mâcon-Loché TGV
 Mâcon-Ville
 Marmagne-sous-Creusot
 Mervans
 Mesvres
 Montceau-les-Mines
 Montchanin
 Navilly
 Paray-le-Monial
 Pontanevaux
 Romanèche-Thorins
 Rully
 Saint-Agnan
 Saint-Léger-sur-Dheune
 Saint-Symphorien-de-Marmagne
 Sennecey-le-Grand
 Senozan
 Tournus

Territoire de Belfort (90)

 Bas-Évette
 Belfort
 Belfort – Montbéliard TGV
 Chèvremont
 Danjoutin
 Delle
 Petit-Croix
 Trois-Chênes

Yonne (89)

 Arcy-sur-Cure
 Augy-Vaux
 Auxerre-Saint-Gervais
 Avallon
 Champigny-sur-Yonne
 Champs-Saint-Bris
 Châtel-Censoir
 Chemilly-Appoigny
 Coulanges-sur-Yonne
 Cravant-Bazarnes
 Étigny-Véron
 Joigny
 Laroche-Migennes
 Lucy-sur-Cure-Bessy
 Mailly-la-Ville
 Monéteau-Gurgy
 Nuits-sous-Ravières
 Pont-sur-Yonne
 Saint-Florentin-Vergigny
 Saint-Julien-du-Sault
 Sens
 Sermizelles-Vézelay
 Tonnerre
 Vermenton
 Villeneuve-la-Guyard
 Villeneuve-sur-Yonne
 Vincelles
 Voutenay

See also
 SNCF 
 List of SNCF stations for SNCF stations in other regions

Bourgogne-Franche-Comte